Hubert Henry Barr, known as Hugh Barr, (born 17 May 1935) is a Northern Irish former footballer who played as a forward at both professional and international levels.

Early and personal life
Born in Ballymena, Barr studied at Queen's University Belfast.

Career

Club career
Barr played for Wellington Street Boys' Brigade, Harryville Amateurs, Ballyclare Comrades, Cliftonville, Loughborough College, Everton, Coleraine, Ballymena United, Linfield, Coventry City and Cambridge United, before becoming player-manager at Ely City.

Barr's goal scoring feats at Linfield attracted much attention. Division 3 Coventry City's manager Jimmy Hill secured his transfer despite other League clubs showing interest. Northern Ireland had capped Barr when he was a Linfield player.

International career
Barr played for Northern Ireland amateur, Northern Ireland B and Northern Ireland. He was a member of the Great Britain squad at the 1960 Summer Olympics, although he did not make an appearance in the tournament.

References

1935 births
Living people
Association footballers from Northern Ireland
Northern Ireland international footballers
Ballyclare Comrades F.C. players
Cliftonville F.C. players
Everton F.C. players
Coleraine F.C. players
Ballymena United F.C. players
Linfield F.C. players
Coventry City F.C. players
Cambridge United F.C. players
Ely City F.C. players
English Football League players
NIFL Premiership players
Footballers at the 1960 Summer Olympics
Olympic footballers of Great Britain
Sportspeople from Ballymena
Association football forwards
Northern Ireland amateur international footballers
Football managers from Northern Ireland
Ely City F.C. managers